Network Gaming Service may directly refer to:

 The Network Gaming Service website related to Central Station (online service)

Otherwise Network Gaming Service may refer to:

Network Gaming Services

PC Services 
 Steam (service)
 Origin (service)
 Epic Games Store
 PlayOnline

Console Services 
 Xbox network
 PlayStation Network
 Nintendo Switch Online
 Nintendo Network
 Nintendo Wi-Fi Connection (Defunct)

Game Streaming Services 
 Google Stadia
 Amazon Luna
 OnLive (Defunct)